The following Confederate States Army units and commanders fought in the Battle of Spotsylvania Court House (May 8–21, 1864) of the American Civil War. The Union order of battle is listed separately. Order of battle compiled from the army organization May 7–12, 1864, army organization May 13–25, 1864, the army organization during the Campaign and the reports.

Abbreviations used

Military rank
 Gen = General
 LTG = Lieutenant General
 MG = Major General
 BG = Brigadier General
 Col = Colonel
 Ltc = Lieutenant Colonel
 Maj = Major
 Cpt = Captain

Other
 (w) = wounded
 (mw) = mortally wounded
 (k) = killed in action
 (c) = captured

Army of Northern Virginia May 8–13, 1864
Gen Robert E. Lee

General Staff:
 Chief Engineer: MG Martin L. Smith
 Chief of Artillery: BG William N. Pendleton
 Assistant Adjutant General: Ltc Walter H. Taylor
 Aide de Camp: Ltc Charles Marshall
 Aide de Camp: Maj Charles S. Venable

First Corps

MG Richard H. Anderson

Second Corps

LTG Richard S. Ewell

General Staff:
 Assistant Adjutant General: Ltc Alexander S. Pendleton
 Assistant Adjutant General: Maj Campbell Brown
 Assistant Inspector General: Col Abner Smead
 Engineer: Maj Benjamin H. Greene
 Aide de Camp: Lt Thomas T. Turner (w)
 Chief of Ordnance: Ltc William Allan
 Medical Director: Dr. Hunter H. McGuire
 Quartermasters: Maj John D. Rogers and Maj A. M. Garber
 Commissaries and subsistence: Maj Wells J. Hawks and Cpt J. J. Lock

Third Corps

LTG Ambrose P. Hill

MG Jubal A. Early

Cavalry Corps

MG J.E.B. Stuart (mw)

Army of Northern Virginia May 14–21, 1864
Gen Robert E. Lee

General Staff:
 Chief Engineer: MG Martin L. Smith
 Chief of Artillery: BG William N. Pendleton
 Assistant Adjutant General: Ltc Walter H. Taylor
 Aide de Camp: Ltc Charles Marshall
 Aide de Camp: Maj Charles S. Venable

First Corps

MG Richard H. Anderson

Second Corps

LTG Richard S. Ewell

General Staff:
 Assistant Adjutant General: Ltc Alexander S. Pendleton
 Assistant Adjutant General: Maj Campbell Brown
 Assistant Inspector General: Col Abner Smead
 Engineer: Maj Benjamin H. Greene
 Chief of Ordnance: Ltc William Allan
 Medical Director: Dr. Hunter H. McGuire
 Quartermasters: Maj John D. Rogers and Maj A. M. Garber
 Commissaries and subsistence: Maj Wells J. Hawks and Cpt J. J. Lock

Third Corps

MG Jubal A. Early

LTG Ambrose P. Hill

Cavalry Corps

See also
 Wilderness Confederate order of battle
 Cold Harbor Confederate order of battle

Notes

References
 Eicher, John H., and David J. Eicher. Civil War High Commands. Stanford, CA: Stanford University Press, 2001. 
 Grimes, Bryan. Extracts of letters of Major General Bryan Grimes to his wife, Raleigh, North Carolina, Edwards, Broughton and Co., Steam Printers and Binders, 1883.
 Rhea, Gordon C. The Battle of the Wilderness May 5–6, 1864. Baton Rouge: Louisiana State University Press, 1994. 
 Rhea, Gordon C. The Battles for Spotsylvania Court House and the Road to Yellow Tavern May 7–12, 1864. Baton Rouge: Louisiana State University Press, 1997. 
 Rhea, Gordon C. To the North Anna River: Grant and Lee, May 13–25, 1864. Baton Rouge: Louisiana State University Press, 2000. 
 Rhea, Gordon C. Cold Harbor: Grant and Lee, May 26 – June 3, 1864. Baton Rouge: Louisiana State University Press, 2002. 
 Sibley, Jr., F. Ray, The Confederate Order of Battle, Volume 1, The Army of Northern Virginia, Shippensburg, Pennsylvania, 1996. 
 U.S. War Department, The War of the Rebellion: a Compilation of the Official Records of the Union and Confederate Armies, U.S. Government Printing Office, 1880–1901.
 Wittenberg, Eric J. Glory Enough For All: Sheridan's Second Raid and the Battle of Trevilian Station. Washington, DC: Brassey's, Inc, 2001. 

American Civil War orders of battle